Zelyony Sad is the name of several rural localities in Russia:
Zelyony Sad, Akhtubinsky District, Astrakhan Oblast, a settlement in Akhtubinsky District, Astrakhan Oblast
Zelyony Sad, Chernoyarsky District, Astrakhan Oblast, a settlement in Chernoyarsky District, Astrakhan Oblast